William F. 'Bill' Hyland (July 30, 1923 – March 2, 2013) was an American lawyer and Democratic Party politician who served as Speaker of the New Jersey General Assembly and Attorney General of New Jersey. Later in life he was a partner in the law firm of Riker Danzig and the executor of the estate of Benny Goodman.

Biography

Hyland was born in Burlington, New Jersey in 1923. He graduated from the Wharton School of the University of Pennsylvania in 1944. From a young age he was an accomplished clarinetist, and he worked his way through college by playing with dance bands.

During World War II, he served as a Lieutenant (junior grade) in the United States Navy. He took part in convoy duty in the Battle of the Atlantic, as well as in the Battle of Iwo Jima and the Battle of Luzon.

Hyland graduated from University of Pennsylvania Law School in 1949 and was admitted to the New Jersey Bar in the same year. He became involved in Democratic politics in Camden County, and was elected to the New Jersey General Assembly in 1954. He served as Speaker of the Assembly in 1958.

Hyland resigned from the Assembly in 1961 when he was nominated by Governor Robert B. Meyner to be the president of the New Jersey Board of Public Utilities. Hyland was one of Meyner's choices to succeed him as the Democratic nominee for Governor of New Jersey in 1961, but he lost the nomination to Richard J. Hughes.

He continued serving on the Public Utilities Board until 1968, when he resigned to return to his law practice in Camden. He returned to public service when Governor Hughes nominated him to be the chairman of the newly created New Jersey State Commission of Investigation. The Commission succeeded in jailing reputed leaders of organized crime on contempt of court charges for refusing to divulge knowledge of criminal activities.

In 1970 Hyland resigned and again returned to his private law practice. In December 1973, Governor-elect Brendan Byrne nominated Hyland as Attorney General of New Jersey. He served from 1974 to 1978, and then joined the law firm Riker, Danzig, Scherer, Debvois and Hyland (later known as Riker, Danzig, Scherer, Hyland & Perretti). He retired from the firm in 2006.

Hyland continued performing as a clarinetist even while serving as Attorney General. In 1976, he had the opportunity to play with Benny Goodman, and the two struck up a friendship. Goodman named him the legal and musical consultant for his estate, responsible for deciding which previously unreleased recordings were appropriate for release. Upon Goodman's death in 1986, Hyland served as executor of his estate.

He died on March 3, 2013.

References

External links
 William F. Hyland at The Political Graveyard
 Official bio, Office of the Attorney General of New Jersey

1923 births
2013 deaths
People from Camden County, New Jersey
Wharton School of the University of Pennsylvania alumni
University of Pennsylvania Law School alumni
New Jersey lawyers
Speakers of the New Jersey General Assembly
Democratic Party members of the New Jersey General Assembly
New Jersey Attorneys General
American clarinetists
United States Navy personnel of World War II
20th-century American lawyers
United States Navy officers
Military personnel from New Jersey